Diego Sebastián Rodríguez Cano (28 May 1988 – 11 September 2010) was a Uruguayan professional footballer who played as a defender.

Career
Born in Montevideo, Rodríguez played for Nacional and Central Español.

Death
Rodríguez was seriously injured in a car crash in Montevideo on 9 September 2010, and was admitted to the ICU at Montevideo's La Española hospital. He had suffered brain and chest trauma as a result of the accident, and died two days later of cardiac arrest at the age of 22. Following Rodríguez' death, tributes came in from Uruguayan football players: national team players Luis Suárez and Diego Forlán both dedicated their goals scored on Saturday to the memory of Rodríguez, as did Mario Regueiro, Luis Aguiar, Edinson Cavani and Sebastián "El Loco" Abreu. Forlán also commented the death on his Twitter account, offering his "condolences to Rodríguez' family, friends, fans of Nacional, and to football in Uruguay".

His remains are buried at Parque del Reencuentro.

References

1988 births
2010 deaths
Uruguayan footballers
Road incident deaths in Uruguay
Burials at Parque del Reencuentro
Association football defenders
Central Español players
Club Nacional de Football players